Pravda (Slovak: "Truth") is a major centre-left newspaper in Slovakia. It is owned by Our Media SR a.s.

History and profile
Pravda was established in 1920. The daily circulation of Pravda in December 2021 was 27,723 copies and the average number of daily sold copies was 20,266. Since 2010, Pravda has seen a continuous increase in the daily news-stand sales. The online version has 2,217,285 real users according to current AIM figures of February 2022. As of the end of 2021, every edition of Pravda daily has been read by about 220 thousand people, which is about 5,1% of Slovak population aged between 14 and 79. 
Pravda is profiled as a liberal left-wing newspaper. Its editor-in-chief has been Jakub Prokeš since 2020.

Pravda is published daily with Užitočná Pravda supplement, offering advice on different matters concerning the pension and social welfare system, finance, law, health, housing or education.

References

External links 
  Official website

Newspapers established in 1920
Newspapers published in Slovakia
Communist newspapers
Eastern Bloc mass media
1920 establishments in Slovakia